The 1910 Lewes by-election was held on 17 June 1910.  The by-election was held due to the death of the incumbent Conservative MP, Sir Henry Aubrey-Fletcher.  It was won by the Conservative candidate William Campion, who was unopposed.

References

1910 in England
Politics of Wealden District
Lewes
1910 elections in the United Kingdom
By-elections to the Parliament of the United Kingdom in East Sussex constituencies
Unopposed by-elections to the Parliament of the United Kingdom (need citation)
20th century in Sussex